In human anatomy, the inferior mesenteric artery, often abbreviated as IMA, is the third main branch of the abdominal aorta and arises at the level of L3, supplying the large intestine from the distal transverse colon to the upper part of the anal canal. The regions supplied by the IMA are the descending colon, the sigmoid colon, and part of the rectum.

Structure

Origin 
The IMA arises from the anterior aspect of the abdominal aorta.

Its origin is situated at the L3 vertebral level, below the origins of the two renal arteries, 3-4 cm above the aortic bifurcation, at the level of the umbilicus, and posterior to the inferior border of the horizontal (III) part of the duodenum.

Branches
Along its course, the IMA has the following branches:

All these arterial branches further divide into arcades which then supply the colon at regular intervals.

Relations
The IMA is accompanied along its course by a similarly named vein, the inferior mesenteric vein, which drains into the splenic vein. The IMV drains to the portal vein and does therefore not fully mirror the course of the IMA.

Distribution 
Proximally, its territory of distribution overlaps (forms a watershed) with the middle colic artery, and therefore the superior mesenteric artery. The SMA and IMA anastomose via the marginal artery of the colon (artery of Drummond) and via Riolan's arcade (also called the "meandering artery", an arterial connection between the left colic artery and the middle colic artery). The territory of distribution of the IMA is more or less equivalent to the embryonic hindgut.

Clinical significance
The IMA and/or its branches must be resected for a left hemicolectomy.

A horseshoe kidney, a common (1 in 500) anomaly of the kidneys, will be positioned below the IMA.

Additional images

References

External links
 Lotti M. Anatomy in relation to left colectomy
  - "Branches of the inferior mesenteric artery."
  - "Posterior Abdominal Wall: Branches of the Abdominal Aorta"
 
 
 
 
  - "Posterior Abdominal Wall, Dissection, Anterior View"
 

Arteries of the abdomen